is a manga series written and illustrated by Shigeru Mizuki. Several versions of the manga exist, one of which was adapted into a live-action TV show, and another into an anime television series. In addition, two movies were spawned from the anime TV series: Akuma-kun: The Movie released in 1989 and Akuma-kun: Yōkoso Akuma Land e!! released in 1990.

An original net anime series has been announced with Toei Animation and director Junichi Sato returning from the previous series. Sato will serve as the chief director with Fumitoshi Oizaki serving as the series director. Hiroshi Ōnogi will oversee the scripts. The series is set to be released worldwide on Netflix in late 2023.

Basic setting
In this series, the contents vary from version to version. The common plot points of every adaptation are listed below.
 The protagonist is a child prodigy who appears once every 10,000 years. The protagonist is always nicknamed “Akuma-kun”.
 Akuma-kun wants to create a world where all human beings can live happily, and he believes that harnessing the power of demons is necessary for him to achieve that goal. Additionally, the entities referred to as demons in the series are not limited to that of Christian origins, rather the series features various monsters described in myths and folk stories from all around the world.
 At the beginning of the story, Akuma-kun has not yet succeeded in the summoning of demons, and has repeatedly conducted magical research and experiments. However Dr. Faust appears and teaches the secrets of summoning demons to Akuma-kun, and as a result he finally succeeds in invoking demons.
 In addition, Dr. Faust gives Akuma-kun the Solomon Flute. This flute gives Akuma-kun the power to bend demons to his will. The flute was used by King Solomon.
 Akuma-kun has multiple subordinates who follow him. They are often referred to as the “twelve apostles”. The twelve apostles also differ from series to series.- To summon demons, Shingo, standing in front of a magic circle casts a spell, ”エロイムエッサイム、我は求め訴えたり”. (Eloim, Essaim, frugativi et appelavi.) This is a spell written in a grimoire spread in France during the 18th and 19th century.

1989 anime series

Characters

Shingo Umoregi (埋れ木 真吾) is a boy in fifth grade. He was nicknamed “Akuma-kun” by his friends due to his immense knowledge of demons and the occult. His father Shigeru Umoregi is a manga artist who struggles to sell his work.
According to Faust, Shingo is said to be the Messiah, who appears once every ten thousand years to bring peace to the world.

List of episodes

Video game

 is a role-playing video game for the Famicom that was released on February 24, 1990, and is based on the anime. It was developed by Tose and published by Bandai.

The game follows Shingo Umoregi (Akuma-kun), who the player controls, through three different types of areas. The world map allows Akuma-kun to visit different towns and dungeons. The world map is in an overhead perspective and features random encounters, which pit Akuma-kun against randomly appearing enemies. During battles, the perspective switches to first-person and the player selects different types of attacks from a menu. During battle, the player can summon demons to aid Akuma-kun with fighting. The player's party and the enemies then take turns attacking each other, similar to most other turn-based RPGs. When Akuma-kun enters a town, the view switches to that of a side-scrolling video game. By moving up at certain areas, Akuma-kun can enter buildings and shops.

The game begins as a wizard explains to Akuma-kun that the world will be a better place if demons and humans establish contact. Akuma-kun then sets out to establish this connection.

See also
 List of video games based on anime or manga

References

External links
 

1989 anime television series debuts
2023 anime ONAs
Anime series based on manga
Bandai games
Encourage Films
Demons in anime and manga
Japanese children's animated fantasy television series
Japanese drama television series
Japan-exclusive video games
Japanese-language Netflix original programming
Japanese role-playing video games
Kodansha manga
Manga series
Netflix original anime
Nintendo Entertainment System games
Nintendo Entertainment System-only games
Manga adapted into television series
Shigeru Mizuki
Shōnen manga
Shueisha manga
Television shows based on manga
Toei Animation television
Tose (company) games
TV Asahi original programming
Upcoming Netflix original programming
Video games based on anime and manga
Video games developed in Japan